Matthew Gilbert High School was a high school for black students in Jacksonville, Florida. Like many black high schools of the time, it was reclassified as a junior high school after integration.  It is now Matthew Gilbert Middle School.

Athletics
The Gilbert Panthers went undefeated (11–0) and won the FIAA State Football championship in 1958.

Notable alumni
Henry Lee Adams Jr., first African-American judge in the middle district of Florida.
Bob Hayes, Olympic sprinter, NFL Wide Receiver, the only athlete to win both an Olympic gold medal and a Super Bowl ring.

References

High schools in Jacksonville, Florida
Duval County Public Schools
Public high schools in Florida
Historically black schools
Historically segregated African-American schools in Florida
1928 establishments in Florida
1970 disestablishments in Florida
Educational institutions established in 1928
Educational institutions disestablished in 1970